Chad Collins is a Canadian politician who was elected to the House of Commons of Canada in the 2021 federal election. He represents Hamilton East—Stoney Creek as a member of the Liberal Party.

Prior to being elected, Collins was a Hamilton, Ontario City Councillor. He was born and raised in Hamilton and attended Glendale Secondary School. He is married and has two children. He is the son of former Ontario provincial MPP Shirley Collins.

Election results

References

External links
 

1970 births
21st-century Canadian politicians
Hamilton, Ontario city councillors
Liberal Party of Canada MPs
Living people
Members of the House of Commons of Canada from Ontario